Yūki (written: , , , etc.) is a Japanese surname. Notable people with the surname include:

 Aira Yuhki (born 1981), Japanese singer
 Yuki Hide a.k.a. Hideyuki Hirano (1940–1998), Japanese singer
 Yūki Hideyasu (1574–1607), Japanese daimyō
 Hiro Yūki (born 1965), Japanese voice actor
, Japanese actor
 Masahiko Yuki (born 1975), Japanese guitarist
 Yūki Masakatsu (1503–1559), Japanese samurai
 Nobuteru Yūki (born 1962), Japanese manga artist, illustrator, and animator
 Satoshi Yuki (born 1972), Japanese Go player
, Japanese basketball player

Fictional characters 
 Akira Yuki, the main character in the game series Virtua Fighter
 Asuna Yuuki, a character in the light novel series Sword Art Online
 Gai Yūki, the main character in the Choujin Sentai Jetman TV series
 Jaden Yuki, the main character in the anime series Yu-Gi-Oh! GX
 Mikan Yuuki, a character in theTo Love Ru manga series
 Ringo Yuuki, a character in theTo Love Ru manga series
 Rito Yuuki, a character in theTo Love Ru manga series
 Saibai Yuuki, a character in theTo Love Ru manga series
 Tetsuya Yuki, the captain in the manga series Ace of Diamond

See also
Yūki clan

Japanese-language surnames